Disney Junior is an Indian pay television channel owned by The Walt Disney Company India. a wholly owned by The Walt Disney Company. The channel is dedicated towards pre-schoolers. It is also available as a programming block on Disney Channel that replaced Playhouse Disney. The channel is the Indian equivalent to the original American network and broadcasts in English, Hindi, Telugu and Tamil.

History
Before 2006, Playhouse Disney was launched in India as a block on Disney Channel. On 4 July 2011, it was replaced by Disney Junior. On 15 October 2012, Disney Junior launched as a channel.

References 

India
English-language television stations in India
Television channels and stations established in 2012
Children's television channels in India
Disney India Media Networks
Disney Star